Notre-Dame-de-Lourdes is a settlement in New Brunswick.

History

Notable people

See also
List of communities in New Brunswick

References

Communities in Madawaska County, New Brunswick